The 2018 FIA World Rally Championship-2 was the sixth season of the World Rally Championship-2, an auto racing championship recognised by the Fédération Internationale de l'Automobile, running in support of the World Rally Championship. It was created when the Group R class of rally car was introduced in 2013. The championship was open to cars complying with R4, R5, and Super 2000 regulations.

Pontus Tidemand and Jonas Andersson were the defending drivers' and co-drivers' champions. Škoda Motorsport were the defending teams' champions. Although Škoda Motorsport went on to win the teams' championship for the third year in a row, Jan Kopecký and Pavel Dresler succeeded for the drivers' and co-drivers' titles defeating the former champions.

Calendar

Entries

Eligible models
The 2018 season saw several new car models become available for competition:
 Citroën made an R5 variation of the C3, known as the Citroën C3 R5. The Citroën DS3 R5 was still eligible to compete.
 Volkswagen entered the World Rally Championship-2 for the first time with the Volkswagen Polo GTI R5, the replacement for the cancelled Polo R WRC project.

Entry list
The following teams and crews were entered in the 2018 FIA World Rally Championship-2:

Results and standings

Season summary

Scoring system
Points were awarded to the top ten classified finishers in each event. Six best results counted towards championship.

FIA World Rally Championship-2 for Drivers

FIA World Rally Championship-2 for Co-Drivers

FIA World Rally Championship-2 for Teams

Notes

References

External links
Official website of the World Rally Championship
Official website of the Fédération Internationale de l'Automobile

 
World Rally Championship-2